Scott Hall is an American jazz trumpeter, composer, arranger, educator, and music producer. He works as a professor of instruction and director of jazz studies at Columbia College Chicago.

Early life and education 
Born in Rockton, Illinois, Hall is an alumnus of Northern Illinois University, where he earned a Bachelor of Music degree. He subsequently received a Master of Music degree from DePaul University.

Career 
Hall has performed at major venues and with several famous jazz artists, including Jon Faddis, Mel Tormé, Kurt Elling, Benny Carter, Joe Lovano, Lennie Niehaus, Lester Bowie, Roy Hargrove, Marcus Belgrave, Cedar Walton, Billy Taylor, Johnny Griffin, Ramsey Lewis, the Art Ensemble of Chicago, the Chicago Jazz Ensemble, among others.

He has recorded several albums with the "Scott Hall Quartet" beginning with Strength in Numbers (1999) featuring eight original jazz compositions written by Hall.

References

American jazz musicians
Living people
Year of birth missing (living people)
People from Rockton, Illinois
People from Winnebago County, Illinois
Musicians from Illinois
Jazz musicians from Illinois
Northern Illinois University alumni
DePaul University alumni
Columbia College Chicago faculty
American jazz educators
American jazz composers
American jazz trumpeters